Christina Jamieson (1864–1942) was a British writer and suffragist known for her association with the Shetland Isles.

Life
Jameson was born to Robert and Barbara Jamieson on 30 June 1864 at Cruisdale, Sandness on the Mainland of Shetland. Her father was a teacher in Sandness and that is the school that she attended. She had seven siblings. She and her mother moved to the capital of Shetland, Lerwick, after her father died in 1899.

She is known for helping to form the Shetland Women's Suffrage Society in 1909 which became associated with the National Union of Women's Suffrage Societies. Despite living hundreds of miles from London she created a banner with Orkney artist Stanley Cursiter which she carried in national processions, including the Women's Coronation Procession on 21 June 1911, with a Miss Courtenay (niece of Orcadian Women's Suffrage Society chair Mary Anne Baikie). She wrote about women's roles and in 1910 she wrote for The Shetland Times about the economic and emotional issues facing local women. She had left-wing views which she shared with her nephew, Bertie.

During the First World War she served on Shetland's school board and led it temporarily. She was the first woman in Shetland to serve on a public committee.

In 1930 she founded the Shetland Folklore Society to help revive Shetland culture. The society met to practise traditional dances. Men would meet at her home, Twageos House, to perform sword dances to local music. She also spent time working to transcribe church records. 

In 1935 she was still suffering with asthma and she left the islands where she had spent her life, to emigrate to New Zealand in the hope of gaining some respite. She died in Nelson in New Zealand in 1942.

References 

1864 births
1942 deaths
People from Shetland
British writers
Shetland writers
British suffragists